1888 was the 102nd season of cricket in England since the foundation of Marylebone Cricket Club (MCC). There was a complete contrast to the previous sunlit summer with its record-breaking run-getting: this time the summer was exceptionally cool and wet, resulting in the dominance of bowlers with many records for wicket-taking set.

Australia toured England to compete for the Ashes. It was the 12th test series between the two sides.

After a run of disastrous results over a number of seasons, Derbyshire was demoted from first-class status and first-class county cricket was now played by only eight teams: Gloucestershire, Kent, Lancashire, Middlesex, Notts, Surrey, Sussex and Yorkshire. Derbyshire recovered first-class status in 1894 and rejoined the Championship in 1895.

Honours
 Champion County – Surrey
 Wisden (Six Great Bowlers of the Year) – George Lohmann, Johnny Briggs, John Ferris, Charles Turner, Sammy Woods, Bobby Peel

Playing record (by county)

Leading batsmen (qualification 20 innings)

Leading bowlers (qualification 1,000 balls)

Ashes tour

The sixth Australia team, under the captaincy of Percy McDonnell, toured England in 1888. The great team of 1882 under Billy Murdoch had largely disintegrated, and under McDonnell, the team was largely dependent on the sensational bowling of Turner and Ferris. Their overall record of nineteen victories and fourteen defeats was a minor improvement on the 1886 team, but the absence of Giffen weakened the batting in an exceptionally wet summer, whilst the support bowlers to Turner and Ferris, including the veteran Harry Boyle, were used so little that they could never get into form. When the weather improved after a dreadful mid-summer, the batting was much too poor to compete with England and the team's results deteriorated with thrashings in the last two Test matches and poor results against the counties.

Thanks mainly to the bowling of Bobby Peel, well supported by Lohmann, Briggs and Barnes, England defeated Australia two tests to one to retain the Ashes.

Notable events
 Following the demotion of Derbyshire, the remaining eight counties arrange a nearly-complete program of home-and-away matches (except for Middlesex not playing Sussex) which paves the way for the first County Championship in 1890.
 5 July – Formation of Glamorgan County Cricket Club took place at a meeting in the Angel Hotel, Cardiff.
 11 August – Surrey beats Sussex by an innings and 485 runs, which remains the most one-sided match in county cricket history. Surrey's score of 698 broke their own 1883 record of 650 as the highest innings total in county cricket.
 23 August – Charles Turner takes his 215th wicket, beating Ted Peate's 1882 record for most wickets in a season. Turner would finish with 283, a total beaten only by Tich Freeman in 1928 and 1933 and Tom Richardson in 1895.
 Surrey's feat of winning twelve of its fourteen games is a winning percentage that has not been equalled since in county cricket, with the best since being fourteen wins in seventeen matches by Warwickshire in 1995.
 John Wisden’s Cricketers' Almanack publishes its first “Cricketers of the Year” for this season.

Notes
An unofficial seasonal title sometimes proclaimed by consensus of media and historians prior to December 1889 when the official County Championship was constituted.  Although there are ante-dated claims prior to 1873, when residence qualifications were introduced, it is only since that ruling that any quasi-official status can be ascribed.
Between 1887 and 1889 an unofficial point system of 1 point for a win and 0.5 points for a draw, devised by the "Cricket Reporting Agency", was used to determine the unofficial "Champion County"

References

Annual reviews
 James Lillywhite's Cricketers' Annual (Red Lilly), Lillywhite, 1889
 John Wisden's Cricketers' Almanack  1889

External links
 CricketArchive – season summaries

1888 in English cricket
English cricket seasons in the 19th century